"The Universal" is a song by English alternative rock band Blur and is featured on their fourth studio album, The Great Escape (1995). It was released on 13 November 1995 as the second single from that album, charting at number five on the UK Singles Chart and number 12 in both Iceland and Ireland.

In keeping with the song's science fiction theme, the single's cover art is an allusion to the opening shot of 2001: A Space Odyssey, and the music video is a tribute to the movie A Clockwork Orange, with the band dressed up in costumes similar to Alex and his droogs. Both films were directed by Stanley Kubrick.

Music video

A music video for the song was directed by Jonathan Glazer. The band is presented in imitation of the opening scenes from the 1971 film A Clockwork Orange, in the Milk Bar. Blur star as the quasi-Droogs, complete with Damon Albarn wearing eyeliner similar to the character Alex DeLarge. They perform in the bar in all-white. Though the band do not engage in their usual vibrant stage demeanor, Damon Albarn frequently turns to the camera and gives a sly, crooked smile. Graham Coxon spends the majority of the video sitting against the wall, while playing his guitar. They also spend some time during the video sitting at a table, watching the people around them.

The bar patrons consist of different groups; a male with two females are openly kissing. The man has lipstick all over his face; a lone female entertains male business colleagues by exploiting their sexual interest in her; two men, one identified as a 'red man' (dressed entirely in red) who used to be 'blue', conduct a stilted (subtitled) conversation; two other men – one of them wearing a vicar's clerical collar – become increasingly drunk on cocktails, laughing more and more hysterically until the clergyman tells his friend something to which the viewer is not privy, causing his friend to withdraw into stunned silence (a device similar to that used in Radiohead's promotional video for the song "Just" in the same year). There are also two old men who make a few comments (again subtitled) marveling at the scene. Blur then walk down the aisle to exit the building. Damon Albarn stops them, then the clergyman moves in to kiss his friend.
There are also scenes outside, showing high rise buildings, where people are gathered around a golf ball speaker atop a roof, listening.

The golf ball-shaped speaker featured in the video was sold in a charity auction in 1999.

Track listings
All music was composed by Albarn, Coxon, James, and Rowntree. All lyrics were composed by Albarn.

7-inch and cassette
 "The Universal" – 4:00
 "Entertain Me" (The Live It! remix) – 7:19

CD1
 "The Universal" – 4:00
 "Ultranol" – 2:42
 "No Monsters in Me" – 3:38
 "Entertain Me" (The Live It! remix) – 7:19

CD2: The Universal II – Live at the BBC
 "The Universal" – 4:11
 "Mr Robinson's Quango" – 4:17
 "It Could Be You" – 3:17
 "Stereotypes" – 3:12

Japanese CD
 "The Universal" – 4:00
 "It Could Be You" (Live at the BBC) – 3:17
 "Stereotypes" (Live at the BBC) – 3:12
 "Entertain Me" (The Live It! remix) – 7:19

Note: the 7-inch vinyl edition was pressed for use on jukeboxes and was not issued commercially.

Charts

Weekly charts

Year-end charts

Certifications

Cover versions
 A cover by Irish singer Joe Dolan in 1998 made it to number 19 on the Irish Singles Chart.

References

1995 songs
1995 singles
Blur (band) songs
Food Records singles
Song recordings produced by Stephen Street
Songs written by Alex James (musician)
Songs written by Damon Albarn
Songs written by Dave Rowntree
Songs written by Graham Coxon